Vijay Vasanth (born Vijayakumar Vasanthakumar on 20 May 1983) is an Indian politician who is a Member of Parliament from Kanyakumari Loksabha constituency. He contested and won the bypoll that took place for Kanyakumari Loksabha constituency in May 2021. He is also an actor who has worked in Tamil language films. He is the son of the late politician and entrepreneur H. Vasanthakumar and also currently serves as the managing director of Vasanth & Co, alongside his political commitments. He entered politics in 2021 after the death of his father, taking up the mantle of General Secretary of the Tamil Nadu Congress Committee.

Career

Politics
Vijay Vasanth entered active politics after the death of his father and sitting MP of Kanyakumari Loksabha constituency in 2020 due to Covid. Prior to that he was assisting his father in constituency related works and also played a major role during his father's election to Parliament. He was appointed General secretary of Tamil Nadu Congress Committee in 2021. Later when bypolls for Kanyakumari were announced in May 2021 he was given ticket by Congress party to contest. His electoral rival was veteran Pon. Radhakrishnan of BJP, who had been an Union minister. Vijay Vasanth won the polls by a majority of 1.34 lakh votes.

Acting
Vijay Vasanth made his debut in Venkat Prabhu's cult sports film, Chennai 600028 (2007), playing a supporting role as a member of the Sharks cricket team. Vasanth was introduced to Venkat Prabhu by his close friend Shiva, who first introduced him to music composer Yuvan Shankar Raja, before he later became acquainted with Prabhu.

The success of that film prompted him to star alongside several of the same co-stars in Thozha, before making a guest appearance in Venkat Prabhu's next project Saroja. Vijay Vasanth then went on to portray a leading role in Samudrakani's Naadodigal alongside Sasikumar and Bharani, with the film becoming a commercial and critical success. He followed it up in 2010 with another supporting role as Gowshik in romantic film, Kanimozhi, where he appeared alongside Jai and Shazahn Padamsee. Vijay Vasanth made a cameo appearance in the film Velaikkaran (2017).

Business
Established by his father H. Vasanthakumar in 1978, Vasanth & Co has over 96 stores across Tamil Nadu, Puducherry, Andhra Pradesh, Kerala and Bengaluru. With a turnover of above Rs 4,000 crore in 2018, the chain of consumer electronics and home appliances is a household name across Tamil Nadu. Vijay Vasanth currently serves as the company's managing director.

Personal life
He is the son of H. Vasanthakumar, founder of Vasanth & Co and former Member of Parliament. He was married in the year 2010. His paternal cousin is Tamilisai Soundararajan, the current governor of Telangana state.

Filmography

References

External links
 

People from Kanyakumari district
Male actors from Tamil Nadu
Tamil male actors
Living people
Loyola College, Chennai alumni
1983 births
Male actors in Tamil cinema